1994 Academy Awards may refer to:

 66th Academy Awards, the 1994 ceremony honoring the best in film for 1993
 67th Academy Awards, the 1995 ceremony honoring the best in film for 1994